Kaj Leo í Bartalsstovu (born 23 June 1991) is a Faroese professional footballer, who is currently playing for Icelandic club ÌA. He has also been capped at senior at junior level for his country.

Club career

Bartalsstovu started his career at Víkingur Gøta where he played 102 times, scoring 23 goals in the process. He signed for Norwegian club Levanger on 21 January 2014.

On 1 February 2016, Bartalsstovu signed a one and a half year contract for Romanian team Dinamo București, becoming the first Faroese footballer contracted to a Romanian Liga I club.

On 14 February 2016, Bartalsstovu made his first team debut for Dinamo București in a 1-0 win against FC Botosani, on 20 May Kaj Leo was released from his contract with Dinamo Bucuresti, after the previous manager stepped down, he later signed for FH.

On 8 November 2016, Bartalsstovu signed a two-year contract for ÍBV. After a short stint with ÍBV which included 
an Icelandic Men's Football Cup win, Bartalsstovu signed for Reykjavík outfit Valur in 2019. The following season was curtailed due to COVID-19 restrictions. Valur were top of the league with four games remaining and were crowned champions. He was later released from his contract with the club. After rumoured interest from clubs in Scandinavia and trials with various Icelandic clubs, Bartalsstovu signed a two year contract with current club ÌA. The deal was confirmed by the club on 15 February 2022.

International career

Bartalsstovu has represented the Faroe Islands at international level, making his first start against Hungary in the UEFA 2016 Qualifiers on 8 October 2015.

International goals
Scores and results list Faroe Islands' goal tally first.

Honours
Víkingur Gøta
Faroe Islands Cup: 2012, 2013
FH
Icelandic Championship: 2016
ÍBV
Icelandic Cup: 2017

References

External links
 
 
 

1991 births
Living people
Faroese footballers
Association football midfielders
Víkingur Gøta players
Levanger FK players
FC Dinamo București players
Fimleikafélag Hafnarfjarðar players
Íþróttabandalag Vestmannaeyja players
Valur (men's football) players
Liga I players
Faroese expatriate footballers
Expatriate footballers in Norway
Expatriate footballers in Romania
Faroese expatriate sportspeople in Norway
Faroe Islands international footballers